Sabi Forest Park is a forest park in the Gambia. Established on January 1, 1954, it covers 73 hectares. It belongs to the Uper River Region (URR) and is about 5 kilometers from Basse Santa Su, which is the administrative seat of the region.

It is located at an altitude of 51 meters.

References

Protected areas established in 1954
Forest parks of the Gambia